Know Your Men is a 1921 American silent melodrama film produced and distributed by Fox Film Corporation, directed by Charles Giblyn, and starring Pearl White. It is now considered to be a lost film.

Plot
As described in a film publication summary, Ellen (White) is in love with Roy Phelps (Lytell), but marries Warren Schuyler (Clarke), who is a good man, to protect her father's honor. Roy later returns and rekindles her love, and Ellen goes with him. However, she soon discovers his villainy, and, penitent, returns and is taken back by her husband, whom she now realizes she loves.

Cast
Pearl White as Ellen Schuyler
Wilfred Lytell as Roy Phelps
Downing Clarke as Warren Schuyler
Harry C. Browne as John Barrett
Estar Banks as Mrs. Barrett
Byron Douglas as Van Horn
William Eville as Watson

See also
1937 Fox vault fire

References

External links

 
allmovie/synopsis; Know Your Men

1921 films
American silent feature films
Fox Film films
Lost American films
1921 drama films
Silent American drama films
American black-and-white films
Melodrama films
1921 lost films
Lost drama films
Films directed by Charles Giblyn
1920s American films